Rod Crane (born 6 September 1991) is a Canadian ice sledge hockey player, and alpine skier.  He competed at the 2022 Winter Paralympics in Para ice hockey, winning a silver medal. He completed at the 2019 World Para Ice Hockey Championships, and 2021 World Para Ice Hockey Championships, winning silver medals. He graduated from Niagara College.

References

External links
 
 

Living people
1991 births
Canadian sledge hockey players
Paralympic sledge hockey players of Canada
Paralympic silver medalists for Canada
Para ice hockey players at the 2022 Winter Paralympics
Medalists at the 2022 Winter Paralympics
Paralympic medalists in sledge hockey